Sisters (translit. Syostry) is a 2001 Russian crime film directed by Sergei Bodrov, Jr. It is notable as being his first and only film as director due to his death while filming his second film the year after. It was awarded Grand Prix for the Best Debut at the 2001 Kinotavr film festival.

Plot
Sveta (Oksana Akinshina) and Dina (Katya Gorina) are two half-sisters. Dina is spoiled and lives with her mother Natalia (Tatiana Kolganova) and father Alik (Roman Ageyev), who is a mid-ranking gangster, while Sveta lives with her grandma (Tatyana Tkach) in a more humble existence and wishes to be a sniper in the Russian Army.

Upon Alik's release from prison after doing some time for a robbery, some of his old associates demand him to pay them back some money he allegedly owes. When he refuses, they attempt to kidnap the two girls to try to intimidate him to give them the money. However they manage to escape, and go on the run from the mob through semi-rural Russia while their father attempts to sort affairs with the other gangsters.

Cast 
 Oksana Akinshina as Svetlana "Sveta" Malakhov
 Yekaterina Gorina as Dinara "Dina" Murtazaeva  
 Roman Ageyevas as Albert "Alik" Murtazaev (dubbed by Mikhail Razumovski)
 Tatiana Kolganova as Natalia Murtazaeva 
 Dmitry Orlov as Aleksandr Palych, ment
 Kirill Pirogov as a gangster who pursues the girls
 Aleksandr Bashirov as Seifullin
 Andrey Krasko as Misha
 Sergei Bodrov, Jr. as guy from jeep

Tagline
When you are eight years old, the whole world is against you. When you are thirteen years old, it's you against the whole world.

Connections to the Brother films
Some believe that Sisters is the unofficial third entry in the Brother film series. Besides the title and the criminal themes, all three feature Sergei Bodrov Jr. onscreen: in Sisters he appears as a possibly mob-connected New Russian. In his last interview Bodrov confirmed that this was indeed a cameo of his Danila character from the Brother films, his way of "saying hello to Balabanov" rather than an attempt to continue the story.

References

External links
 
 
 
 

2001 films
2001 directorial debut films
2001 crime thriller films
Russian action thriller films
Russian crime thriller films
2000s Russian-language films
Films about the Russian Mafia
Films about sisters
Films set in Saint Petersburg
Films shot in Saint Petersburg